I, Mona Lisa (UK title Painting Mona Lisa) is a historical novel by Jeanne Kalogridis about Lisa Gherardini, the model for Leonardo da Vinci's painting Mona Lisa. Lisa is portrayed as a young Italian woman who learns about the murder of Giuliano de' Medici, the brother of Lorenzo de' Medici in the Pazzi conspiracy. Guiliano's murder casts a shadow, especially as one of the killers has not been found. She later  falls in love with Giuliano's namesake, Lorenzo's son Giuliano in the aftermath of Girolamo Savonarola's uprising in the late 15th century.

It's an intricately woven tale of betrayal, love, and loss, which unravels the mysteries surrounding Leonardo da Vinci's most famous portrait, Mona Lisa, and its links with the main character Lisa Gherardini, with added plot twists.

2006 American novels
American historical novels

Novels set in the 15th century
Novels set in the Renaissance
Novels set in Florence
Mona Lisa
Cultural depictions of Leonardo da Vinci